Line M3 is a line of the Charleroi Metro in Belgium operated by TEC Charleroi, running from Gosselies (north of Charleroi) to the loop around downtown Charleroi, before heading back to Gosselies.

Introduction of new line numbers (M1, M2, M3 and M4) in February 2012 coincided with the formal association of colors to line numbers. The official color for Line M3 is yellow.

Operations
It has 18 stations on the tram portion of the line.

Trams drive on the right for the full journey.

Trams on Line M3 run from 05:00 until 20:00 with frequencies of:

 Every 10 minutes from Monday to Friday except public holidays.
 Every 15 minutes on Saturdays except public holidays.
 Every 20 minutes on Sundays and public holidays.

Replacement night bus service
A replacement bus service, similarly numbered M3ab on timetables (with "ab" standing for "autobus"), operates with roughly the same itinerary, from 20:00 to 23:00.

List of stations

Tram stops
The following tram stops are found on the northern portion of the M3 line:

 Faubourg de Bruxelles
 Rue du Chemin de Fer
 Emailleries
 City Nord
 Chuassée de Fleurus
 Rue Léopold
 Calvaire
 Bruyerre
 Carrosse
 Madeleine
 Rue Berteau
 Chaussée de Gilly
 Puissant
 Saint Antoine
 Marie Curie
 Deschassis
 La Planche
 Sacré Madame

Premetro stations
The following stations are found on the full metro portion of the system in central Charleroi:

 Piges
 Ouest
 Villette
 Sud
 Sambre
 Tirou
 Parc
 Janson
 Waterloo
 Beaux-Arts

Charleroi Metro
Railway services introduced in 2013